Vlădeni is a commune in Botoșani County, Western Moldavia, Romania. It is composed of five villages: Brehuiești, Hrișcani, Huțani, Mândrești and Vlădeni.

References

Communes in Botoșani County
Localities in Western Moldavia